The Pennsylvania Railroad Freight Station, also called the Chartiers Valley Railway Freight Station, is a historic,  former train station building in Washington, Pennsylvania. It was listed on the National Register of Historic Places on July 21, 1995.

It is designated as a historic public landmark by the Washington County History & Landmarks Foundation.

History 
The station was built in 1871 for Chartiers Valley Railroad and was leased later that year to the Pittsburgh, Cincinnati and St. Louis Railroad (PC&StL). The Chartiers Valley Railroad was merged with the Pittsburgh, Cincinnati, Chicago and St. Louis Railroad (PCC&StL) in 1907. The Pennsylvania Railroad leased the Pittsburgh, Cincinnati, Chicago and St. Louis Railroad (PCC&StL) in 1921. The Pennsylvania Railroad was eventually merged with the New York Central Railroad to form Penn Central. Penn Central declared bankruptcy on 1970 and the station was sold to a private individual, instead of being transferred with the rest of Penn Central's assets to Conrail in 1976.

See also 
 National Register of Historic Places listings in Washington County, Pennsylvania

References

External links

 

Railway stations in the United States opened in 1871
Railway freight houses on the National Register of Historic Places
Railway buildings and structures on the National Register of Historic Places in Pennsylvania
Victorian architecture in Pennsylvania
Buildings and structures in Washington County, Pennsylvania
Washington, Pennsylvania
Former Pennsylvania Railroad stations
National Register of Historic Places in Washington County, Pennsylvania
Former railway stations in Pennsylvania